The Lord Privy Seal (or, more formally, the Lord Keeper of the Privy Seal) is the fifth of the Great Officers of State in the United Kingdom, ranking beneath the Lord President of the Council and above the Lord Great Chamberlain. Originally, its holder was responsible for the monarch's personal (privy) seal (as opposed to the Great Seal of the Realm, which is in the care of the Lord Chancellor) until the use of such a seal became obsolete. Though one of the oldest offices in European governments, it has no particular function today because the use of a privy seal has been obsolete for centuries; it may be regarded as a traditional sinecure, but today, the holder of the office is invariably given a seat in the Cabinet of the United Kingdom, and is sometimes referred to as a Minister without Portfolio. 

Since the premiership of Clement Attlee, the position of Lord Privy Seal has frequently been combined with that of Leader of the House of Lords or Leader of the House of Commons.  The office of Lord Privy Seal, unlike those of Leader of the Lords or Commons, is eligible for a ministerial salary under the Ministerial and other Salaries Act 1975. The office does not confer membership of the House of Lords, leading to Ernest Bevin's remark on holding this office that he was "neither a Lord, nor a Privy, nor a Seal".

During the reign of Edward I, prior to 1307, the Privy Seal was kept by the Controller of the Wardrobe. The Lord Privy Seal was the president of the Court of Requests during its existence.

List of Lord Keepers of the Privy Seal

Lord Keepers of the Privy Seal (c. 1307–1714)

Lord Keepers of the Privy Seal (1714–present)

Notes

Other countries
 Keeper of the seals of France
 Lord Keeper of the Privy Seal of Japan
 Keeper of the Rulers' Seal of Malaysia

See also
 Chancellor of the Duchy of Lancaster
 Keeper of the seals
 Keeper of the Privy Seal of Scotland
 Lord Keeper of the Great Seal
 Lord Privy Seal (term), as used in the television news business

Citations

References
 

Lists of government ministers of the United Kingdom
Ministerial offices in the United Kingdom
Lists of British people
1307 establishments in England